Rukometni Klub Sloboda Tuzla, commonly abbreviated as RK Sloboda Tuzla is a team handball club based in Tuzla, Bosnia and Herzegovina. It is part of the RSD Sloboda Tuzla.

It plays its home games in Mejdan, Tuzla. The clubs greatest success are three Handball Championship of Bosnia and Herzegovina titles.

History 

Club was founded in 1959 as charter of RSD Sloboda Tuzla. Since its foundation the club's sponsor has been the local salt factory called Solana. Club has played first international match since Bosnia and Herzegovina has gained independence. In season 2016/2017 it competed in League of Federation of Bosnia and Herzegovina following relegation from Handball Championship of Bosnia and Herzegovina in season 2015/2016.

Honours

Domestic competitions

League
Handball Championship of Bosnia and Herzegovina: 
 Winners (3): 1994, 1995, 1996
First League of Federation of Bosnia and Herzegovina – North: 
 Winners (1): 2018

Cups
Handball Cup of Bosnia and Herzegovina:
 Winners (4): 1994, 1996, 2020, 2021

Recent seasons
The recent season-by-season performance of the club:

Key

Team

Staff
Staff for the 2020–21 season

Current squad
Squad for the 2020–21 season

Goalkeepers
99  Milenko Jelić
11  Sidik Omerović
1   Zdravko Čajić
Left wingers
7  Enes Skopljak
Right wingers
2  Omar Karahodžić
Line players
 17  Marko Pedić
 61  Ermin Jusić
6  Semir Memić
6  Darko Ilić

Left backs
 69  Rashid Kayumov
 39  Arnad Hamzić
 25  Bakir Pirić
9  Harun Djana
Central backs
4  Adi Omeragić
5  Amer Denjo
4  Jovan Talevski
7  Mirza Jusufović
94  Sedžad Abdurahmanović
23  Kerim Torlaković
Right backs
10  Emir Suhonjić (c)
19  Dino Mehić
15  Harun Đulić

Coaching history

 Srđan Praljak (1986–1991)
 Damir Cipurković ( – February 19, 2009)
 Mirza Bulić (August 5, 2018 – October 26, 2019)
 Nedžad Mašić (October 26, 2019 – January 3, 2020)
 Davor Kadić (January 6, 2020 – present)

References

Bosnia and Herzegovina handball clubs
Sport in Tuzla